UFC 42: Sudden Impact was a mixed martial arts event held by the Ultimate Fighting Championship on April 25, 2003, at American Airlines Arena in Miami, Florida.  The event was broadcast live on pay-per-view in the United States, and later released on DVD.

History
UFC 42 was the first UFC event to take place in Florida.  Headlining the event was a Welterweight Title bout between Matt Hughes and Sean Sherk. UFC 42 also marked the first UFC appearance of future Middleweight Champion Rich Franklin.

Joe Rogan provided the lead commentary for this event and was joined by colour commentator Phil Baroni with further analysis by Eddie Bravo.

Results

See also 
 Ultimate Fighting Championship
 List of UFC champions
 List of UFC events
 2003 in UFC

External links
 UFC42 fights review

Ultimate Fighting Championship events
2003 in mixed martial arts
Mixed martial arts in Florida
Sports competitions in Miami
2003 in sports in Florida